The law of Vatican City State consists of many forms, the most important of which is the canon law of the Catholic Church. The organs of state are governed by the Fundamental Law of Vatican City State. The Code of Penal Procedure governs tribunals and the Lateran Treaty governs relations with the Italian Republic.

Canon law

The canon law of the Catholic Church is supreme in the civil legal system of Vatican City State. The Supreme Tribunal of the Apostolic Signatura, a dicastery of the Roman Curia and the highest canonical tribunal, is also the final court of cassation in the civil legal system of Vatican City State. Its competence includes appeals concerning legal procedure and judicial competence. According to a 2008 law issued by Pope Benedict XVI, the civil legal system of Vatican City State recognizes canon law as its first source of norms and first principle of interpretation. Pope Francis has stated that principles of canon law are essential to the interpretation and application of the laws of Vatican City State.

Fundamental Law

The Fundamental Law of Vatican City State, promulgated by Pope John Paul II on 26 November 2000, consists of 20 articles and is the constitutional law of the Vatican City State. It obtained the force of law on 22 February 2001, Feast of the Chair of St. Peter, Apostle, and replaced in its entirety the Fundamental Law of Vatican City promulgated by Pope Pius XI on 7 June 1929 (Law n. I). All the norms in force in Vatican City State which were not in agreement with the new Law were abrogated and the original of the Fundamental Law, bearing the Seal of Vatican City State, was deposited in the Archive of the Laws of Vatican City State and the corresponding text was published in the Supplement to the Acta Apostolicae Sedis. 

The Fundamental Law governs the civil government of Vatican City State, while the apostolic constitution Pastor Bonus governs the Roman Curia which assists the pope in the governance of the Catholic Church. In April 2019, it was announced that a document titled Praedicate Evangelium (“Preach the Gospel”) will serve as the new apostolic constitution governing the Roman Curia, which Pope Francis was expected to promulgate on 29 June 2019.

Positive civil and penal law
Most of the positive and penal civil law—in contrast to canon law with civil effects—is based on the Italian code from 1889. It was outdated in many ways. This was amended in a major fashion in 2013 to include a number of United Nations Conventions the state has signed over the years, as well as bringing it up to date. The penal code now includes specifics defining money laundering, explicit listing of sexual crimes, and violating confidentiality. Since life imprisonment was abolished by Pope Francis in 2013, the maximum penalty is 30 to 35 years of imprisonment.

In 2008, the Vatican announced that it will no longer automatically adopt new Italian laws, as many Italian laws diverge from Catholic doctrine. The announcement came in the wake of conflict over right-to-life issues following the Eluana Englaro case. Existing law provided that Italian laws were accepted automatically except on bilateral treaties or those that have a sharp divergence with basic canon law. Under the new procedure, the Vatican would examine Italian laws before deciding whether to adopt them. However, as the Vatican had not always accepted Italian laws under the old procedure little would change, with one newspaper commentator calling the announcement a "masked warning" to the Italian government.

On March 29, 2019, one month after a historic Vatican sex abuse summit was held, Pope Francis issued a new Vatican City law requiring Vatican City officials, including those in the Roman Curia, and foreign nuncios affiliated with the Vatican government, to report sex abuse. Failure to do so can result in a fine of up to 5,000 euros (about $5,600) or, in the case of a Vatican gendarme, up to six months in prison. The statute of limitations was also increased from 4 years to 20 years and any Vatican employee found guilty will be dismissed on a mandatory basis. On May 9, 2019, a new law was issued to male and female church workers not just in the Vatican, but throughout the world to disclose any report of sex abuse.

In February 2021, Pope Francis amended articles 17, 376, 379 of the penal code of the Vatican. "These changes may affect the Vatican’s impending trial of the 39-year-old Italian woman Cecilia Marogna, who has been accused of embezzlement, which she denies."

In April 2021, Pope Francis published an apostolic letter motu proprio to change some articles so that Vatican City court can judge cardinals and bishops.

International law
Officials of the State of Vatican City have diplomatic immunity under international law. Hence, if they are accused of a crime in their host country, they are ordinarily recalled to the State of Vatican City to face civil trial, and, if applicable, to face canonical trial at the Congregation for the Doctrine of the Faith (CDF) or competent dicastery. Under the coming new Constitution, however, the authority of the CDF will be weakened and the Pontifical Commission for the Protection of Minors will join the Roman Curia with greater authority as well. A new “super dicastery” which promotes evangelization will also serve as the main institution in the Roman Curia.

Judiciary

The judicial system of Vatican City consists of:

 a sole judge (Giudice Unico, Solus Iudex) with limited jurisdiction
 a tribunal (tribunale, atrium) with four members
 a Court of Appeal (Corte d'Appello, Curia Appellationis) with four members 
 a Supreme Court (Corte di Cassazione, Curia Cassationis) with three members

Justice is exercised in the name of the Supreme Pontiff.

The sole judge has to be a Vatican citizen and he can simultaneously serve as a member of the tribunal. The tribunal itself consists of a president and three other judges (however, cases are heard in a curia of three judges). A promoter of justice (Promotore di Giustizia) serves as attorney both at the tribunal and at the court of the sole judge. The members of the tribunal, the sole judge and the promoter of justice are all lay jurists and are appointed by the pope.

On May 7, 2015, Pope Francis appointed as a Judge of the Ecclesiastical Court of Vatican City State, Lucio Banerjee, a cleric of the Roman Catholic Diocese of Treviso, in Treviso, Italy, and Paolo Scevola, of the Roman Catholic Diocese of Vigevano, to serve as Notary Actuary of the same court; they are officials of the General Affairs Section of the Secretariat of State of the Holy See. On September 30, 2017, Pope Francis named Denis Baudot, an official of the Apostolic Signatura and a priest of the Archdiocese of Lyon in Lyon, France, Judicial Vicar of the Ecclesiastical Tribunal of Vatican City State.

The Court of Appeal consists of the president and three other judges (similar to the tribunal, cases are heard in a curia of three judges). The members of the Court of Appeal are appointed by the pope for a term of five years and are both clerics and lay persons. The Promoter of Justice of the Court of Appeals of Vatican City is currently, since his appointment by Pope Francis on Wednesday, June 12, 2013, Professor Raffaele Coppola, Professor of the Law Faculty at the State University of Bari in Bari, Italy, and a member of the Bar for canon and civil law in the Holy See.

The Supreme Court consists of its president, who is by law the Cardinal Prefect of the Apostolic Signatura, currently Cardinal Dominique Mamberti, and two other cardinals, who are appointed by the President for a period of three years and who also have to be members of the Signatura. Additionally two or more judges are appointed for a three year term (giudici applicati). Ordinarily cases are decided by the Cardinal judges; if opportune (e.g. in cases with higher legal complexity) two of the giudici applicati complement the judicial panel.

All courts have their seat at the Palazzo del Tribunale at Piazza Santa Marta behind Saint Peter's Basilica.

On 16 March 2020, it was announced that Pope Francis signed a new motu proprio into law on March 13, 2020 which reforms the Vatican's judicial system. The motu proprio, titled Law CCCLI, updates the laws governing the Vatican's judiciary system and replaced the previous judicial system which was founded in 1987. The new law provides for greater independence of judicial bodies and magistrates dependent on the Pope. It also specifies the requirements for the appointment of judges and it simplifies the judicial system while increasing the staff of the court. Furthermore, it provides a head for the Office of the Promoter of Justice (prosecutor's office), and sets out a standardized procedure for possible disciplinary action against certified advocates.

On 14 October 2020, the first ever in-person criminal sex abuse trial held within the Vatican City walls, and also prosecuted by the Vatican city state itself, began, and involved a priest accused of sexually abusing a former St. Pius X youth seminary student between 2007 and 2012 and another for aiding and abetting the abuse. The accused abuser, Rev. Gabriele Martinelli, 28, was a seminarian and has since become a priest. The other defendant is the seminary's 72-year-old former rector Rev. Enrico Radice, who was charged with aiding and abetting the alleged abuse. On 6 October 2021, a Vatican court acquitted both Martinelli and Radice.

Incarceration
The Vatican Gendarmerie has a limited number of prison cells. Convicted criminals are held in Italian prisons under the terms of the Lateran Treaty.

See also
Crime in Vatican City
Federico Cammeo
Index of Vatican City-related articles

References

External links

"Researching the Law of Vatican City State"
Law Library of Congress Guide to Law Online: Holy See
"Apostolic Letter issued motu proprio of the Supreme Pontiff Francis on the Jurisdiction of Judicial Authorities of Vatican City State in Criminal Matters", 11 July 2013. 

 
Government of Vatican City